The Hounslow Loop Line is a railway line in southwest London which was opened by the London and South Western Railway in 1850. Barnes Railway Bridge carries the line over the River Thames. Passenger services, all operated by South Western Railway, either loop back to Waterloo by the junctions or continue southwest via Feltham. The line is electrified at 750 V DC (third rail). It provides access to the North London Line for freight services both passing through  to the north east and connecting to the rail network to the south west.

Passenger services and rolling stock
The typical weekday service in trains per hour is:
 2 from Waterloo, taking the loop at Barnes and leaving it beyond  to go via  to return to Waterloo
 2 from Waterloo, running via Richmond and taking the loop at Hounslow and returning to Waterloo
 2 from Waterloo, taking the loop at Barnes and leaving it beyond Hounslow to go via  to 
 2 from Weybridge, taking the loop at Hounslow and returning to Waterloo

Limited trains to/from London start/terminate at Hounslow, however South Western Railway timetables and departure boards indicate that every other train from Waterloo terminates or starts at Hounslow whilst they are actually running as loop services. 

The Sunday service is
 1 train per hour in each direction between Waterloo and  via Staines
 1 train per hour between Waterloo and Hounslow via Brentford in the afternoon.

Services are generally operated by Class 707s, operating in 5 or 10-car configuration. These trains entered service in August 2017. Class 450, Class 455 and Class 458 units also work the line. All units on the line are to be replaced by Class 701 Aventra units, with introduction planned for 2020.

Ridership
The line has seen a steep increase in ridership levels in recent years, corresponding with the doubling of train frequencies from 2 trains per hour in each direction to 4 (except on Sundays). The line's seven stations had combined passenger numbers of 5.565 million in 2007–08 (based on station exits), a 162% increase on the 2004–05 figure of 2.122 million.

Recent changes
Most stations had platforms lengthened to allow the operation of 10 coach trains from May 2013.  Where this was not possible, selective door opening is used. 

Platform 20 at Waterloo (within the former  terminal) came into use in May 2014 to provide additional capacity.

Future developments
A proposal published in 2017 by the London Assembly and Transport for London envisages extending the London Overground network to run trains on the section of the Hounslow Loop Line between Brentford and Hounslow. The plans are currently at public consultation stage with TfL.

References

Further reading

External links

 South West Trains

Railway lines in London
Railway branch lines
Railway loop lines
Standard gauge railways in London
Transport in the London Borough of Hounslow
Transport in the London Borough of Richmond upon Thames